Dallas is a city and the county seat of Polk County, Oregon, United States. The population was 16,854 at the 2020 census.

It is part of the Salem Metropolitan Statistical Area.

History
Pioneers in the 1840s started the settlement that became known as Dallas on the north side of Rickreall Creek. It was originally named "Cynthian" or "Cynthiana". A 1947 Itemizer-Observer article states: "[T]he town was called Cynthiana after Cynthiana, Ky., so named by Mrs. Thos. Lovelady." According to the county historical society in 1987, Mrs. Thomas J. Lovelady named the new settlement after her home town of Cynthiana, Kentucky.

Another source claims that Cynthia Ann, wife of early pioneer Jesse Applegate, named the settlement. But they lived in the Salt Creek area of northern Polk County and, according to the 1850 Federal Census, she was not living in Polk County then. 

Dallas post office was established in 1852. In 1856, the town was moved more than a mile south because of an inadequate supply of water.

Cynthiana competed with Independence to be selected as the county seat. Its  residents raised $17,000 in order to have a branch of the narrow gauge railroad constructed to their town, which secured them the honor and related economic stimulus. The line was built from 1878–80. Town leaders believed a more sturdy sounding name was needed for a county seat. Since George Mifflin Dallas was vice-president under James K. Polk, for whom the county was named, they named it "Dallas".

Dallas was incorporated as a town in 1874 and as a city in 1901.

Gerlinger family

In 1902, Louis's son George T. Gerlinger organized a group of investors to build related railroad lines in the area. On May 29, 1903, the first train ran from Dallas to Falls City.

Willamette Industries was founded in Dallas in 1906. At that time the company name was Willamette Valley Lumber Company. Louis Gerlinger, Sr. was president of the new company and H. L. Pittock, vice president. George T. Gerlinger served as secretary and manager, and F. W. Leadbetter was treasurer. George Cone served as director and mill superintendent. In 1967, Willamette Valley Lumber and several others merged to become Willamette Industries.

In the early 21st century, this and other local businesses were taken over by others from outside, which eventually affected the local economy. In March 2002, Willamette Industries was officially acquired by Weyerhaeuser Company in a hostile takeover. In early 2009, Weyerhaeuser's Mill formally closed the Dallas operation. Similarly, Gerlinger Carrier Company in Dallas was taken over by Towmotor.

Geography

Climate
Dallas has a Mediterranean climate (Köppen Csb) with warm to very warm, dry summers with cool mornings, and cold, rainy winters.

As with most of Oregon, the driest "rain year" was from July 1976 to June 1977 and saw only .

Spring arrives slowly with pleasant afternoon temperatures and less heavy rainfall by April, although showers are common until into June. Low humidity and pleasant mornings make this season comfortable, although airflows from the hot continent can bring spells of sweltering and arid weather, with  reached on July 19, 1956, and on August 8, 1981.

Demographics

The median income in 2000 for a household in the city was $35,967, and the median income for a family was $45,156. Males had a median income of $34,271 versus $22,941 for females. The per capita income for the city was $16,734. About 7.8% of families and 9.8% of the population were below the poverty line, including 13.2% of those under age 18 and 5.8% of those age 65 or over.

2010 census
As of the census of 2010, there were 14,583 people, 5,747 households, and 3,952 families residing in the city. The racial makeup of the city was 92.6% White, 0.2% African American, 2.0% Native American, 0.8% Asian, 0.1% Pacific Islander, 1.6% from other races, and 2.7% from two or more races. Hispanic or Latino people of any race were 5.9% of the population.

There were 5,747 households, of which 32.2% had children under the age of 18 living with them, 51.8% were married couples living together, 12.3% had a female householder with no husband present, 4.6% had a male householder with no wife present, and 31.2% were non-families. 26.5% of all households were made up of individuals, and 13.7% had someone living alone who was 65 years of age or older. The average household size was 2.49 and the average family size was 2.98.

The median age in the city was 39.8 years. 25% of residents were under the age of 18; 7.9% were between the ages of 18 and 24; 23.3% were from 25 to 44; 24.8% were from 45 to 64; and 18.8% were 65 years of age or older. The gender makeup of the city was 47.9% male and 52.1% female.

Media
The Polk County Itemizer-Observer is a weekly newspaper published in Dallas since 1875. KWIP (880 AM) is the only radio station currently licensed to the city.

Infrastructure
Dallas' only hospital is West Valley Hospital. Oregon Route 223 is the only state highway that serves the city.

Notable people

Jeri Ellsworth, self-taught computer chip designer
Darcy Fast, Major League Baseball pitcher for the Chicago Cubs
Carl Gerlinger, founder of Gerlinger Carrier Company
George T. Gerlinger, founder of Willamette Industries
Irene Hazard Gerlinger, first female regent of the University of Oregon
Louis Gerlinger Sr., founder of the Salem, Falls City and Western Railway
Mark Hatfield, former Governor of Oregon; United States senator, 1967–1997
Johnny Kitzmiller, football player and College Football Hall of Fame member
Jordan Poyer, pro football strong safety for the Buffalo Bills
Johnnie Ray, 1950s singer and recording artist

See also
Dallas High School
Ellendale, Oregon

References

External links

City of Dallas Oregon
Entry for Dallas in the Oregon Blue Book
Dallas Area Chamber of Commerce

 
Cities in Oregon
County seats in Oregon
Cities in Polk County, Oregon
Salem, Oregon metropolitan area
Willamette Valley
1840s establishments in Oregon